Besame Mucho is a 1987 Brazilian romance drama film directed by Francisco Ramalho Jr., based on the play of the same name by Mário Prata.

Cast
Antônio Fagundes as Tuca
Christiane Torloni as Dina
José Wilker as Xico
Glória Pires as Olga
Giulia Gam as Aninha
Paulo Betti as César
Isabel Ribeiro as Encarnacion
Linda Gay as Dina's mother
Wilma Aguiar as Tuca's mother
Jesse James as watchman
Iara Jamra as debutante #1
Vera Zimmermann as debutante #2

Production
The filming took place in July 1986 in different locations of São Paulo, including Faculdade São Franscisco and Cine Copan.

Reception
It was awarded the Best Film at the 13th Festival de Cine Iberoamericano de Huelva, Best Screenplay at the Cartagena Film Festival, and won the Best Screenplay and Best Costume Design awards at the 15th Gramado Film Festival.

References

External links

1987 romantic drama films
1987 films
Brazilian romantic drama films
Brazilian films based on plays
Films shot in São Paulo
1980s Portuguese-language films
Films scored by Wagner Tiso